The Wall Can Sing is a collection of 60 essays by Nobel prize-winning author Mo Yan.

Works by Mo Yan
2012 non-fiction books
Essay collections